The 33rd Filmfare Awards were held in 1986, in Mumbai, India.

Ram Teri Ganga Maili and Saagar led the ceremony with 10 nominations each, followed by Meri Jung and Tawaif with 7 nominations.

Ram Teri Ganga Maili won 5 awards, including Best Film and Best Director (for Raj Kapoor), thus becoming the most-awarded film at the ceremony.

Main awards

Best Film
 Ram Teri Ganga Maili 
Arjun
Ghulami
Meri Jung
Saagar
Tawaif

Best Director
 Raj Kapoor – Ram Teri Ganga Maili 
Mahesh Bhatt – Janam
Rahul Rawail – Arjun
Ramesh Sippy – Saagar
Subhash Ghai – Meri Jung

Best Actor
 Kamal Haasan – Saagar 
Amitabh Bachchan – Mard
Anil Kapoor – Meri Jung
Kumar Gaurav – Janam
Rishi Kapoor – Tawaif

Best Actress
 Dimple Kapadia – Saagar 
Jaya Prada – Sanjog
Mandakini – Ram Teri Ganga Maili
Padmini Kolhapure – Pyaar Jhukta Nahin
Rati Agnihotri – Tawaif

Best Supporting Actor
 Amrish Puri – Meri Jung 
Anupam Kher – Janam
Kamal Haasan – Saagar
Kulbhushan Kharbanda – Ghulami
Saeed Jaffrey – Ram Teri Ganga Maili
Utpal Dutt – Saaheb

Best Supporting Actress
 Nutan – Meri Jung 
Anita Kanwar – Janam
Madhur Jaffrey – Saagar
Raakhee – Saaheb
Sushma Seth – Tawaif
Tanvi Azmi – Pyari Behna

Best Comic Actor
 Amjad Khan – Maa Kasam 
 Amjad Khan – Utsav
Annu Kapoor – Utsav
Deven Verma – Saaheb
Kader Khan – Aaj Ka Daur

Best Story
 Tawaif – Dr. Aleem Masroor 
Ankahee – C. T. Khanolkar
Arjun – Javed Akhtar
Janam – Mahesh Bhatt
Ram Teri Ganga Maili – K. K. Singh
Saaheb – Rajan Roy

Best Screenplay
 Paar – Goutam Ghose and Partho Mukherjee

Best Dialogue
 Tawaif – Rahi Masoom Raza

Best Music Director 
 Ram Teri Ganga Maili – Ravindra Jain 
Meri Jung – Laxmikant–Pyarelal
Pyaar Jhukta Nahin – Laxmikant–Pyarelal
Saagar – R.D. Burman
Sur Sangam – Laxmikant–Pyarelal

Best Lyricist
 Utsav – Vasant Dev for Dil Kyun Behka 
Meri Jung – Anand Bakshi for Zindagi Har Kadam
Ram Teri Ganga Maili – Hasrat Jaipuri for Sun Sahiba Sun
Saagar – Javed Akhtar for Saagar Kinare
Saaheb – Anjaan for Yaar Bina Chain Kahaan Re
Tawaif – Hasan Kamal for Bohot Der Se

Best Playback Singer, Male
 Saagar – Kishore Kumar for Saagar Kinare 
Pyaar Jhukta Nahin – Shabbir Kumar for Tum Se Milkar Naa Jaane Kyun
Ram Teri Ganga Maili – Suresh Wadkar for Main Hi Main Hoon

Best Playback Singer, Female
 Utsav – Anuradha Paudwal for Mere Mann Bajo Mridang 
Pyaar Jhukta Nahin – Kavita Krishnamurthy for Tum Se Milkar Naa Jaane Kyun
Saaheb – S. Janaki for Yaar Bina Chain Kahaan Re

Best Art Direction
 Ram Teri Ganga Maili  – Suresh J. Sawant

Best Cinematography
 Saagar  – S. M Anwar

Best Editing
 Ram Teri Ganga Maili  – Raj Kapoor

Best Sound
 Shiva Ka Insaaf  – A RadhaSwami

Critics' awards

Best Film
 Aaghat

Best Documentary
 Bombay – Our City

Most Wins
Ram Teri Ganga Maili – 5/10 'Saagar – 4/10Tawaif – 3/7Utsav – 2/4Meri Jung – 2/7''

See also
 32nd Filmfare Awards
 34th Filmfare Awards
 Filmfare Awards

References

 https://archive.org/details/FilmfareAwards
 https://www.imdb.com/event/ev0000245/1986/

Filmfare Awards
Filmfare